"Sounds Like a Melody" is a song by the German group Alphaville, from the group's debut album Forever Young. The single was released in 1984.

The song was a big success in continental Europe and South Africa, reaching the Top 10; it topped the charts in Italy and Sweden, and was certified Gold in Germany.

Song background
Originally, Alphaville had planned to release "Forever Young" as their second single, to follow the success of "Big in Japan". However, record studio executives requested that Alphaville release an additional song between the two singles, and as a result "Sounds Like a Melody" was written and arranged in just two days. Of the experience, singer Marian Gold said "the whole affair felt like an insult to our naive hippie instincts. Writing music exclusively for the sake of commercial success seemed like the sell-out of our virtual beliefs. On the other hand, did this not open up possibilities for wonderful games to play in the brave new world of pop music?" This corporate pressure caused the band to dislike the song and they refused to play it live for over 10 years.

Track listings
 7" Single WEA
 "Sounds Like a Melody" – 4:29
 "The Nelson Highrise Sector One: the Elevator" – 3:14

 12" Maxi WEA
 "Sounds Like a Melody (Special Long Version)" – 7:42
 "The Nelson Highrise Sector One: the Elevator" – 4:12

 12" Maxi Record Store Day 2020 Yellow vinyl
 "Sounds Like a Melody (Grant & Kelly Remix)" - 8:33
 "Sounds Like a Melody (Special Long Version Remastered)" - 7:43

 The 7" and 12" versions differ greatly from the version released later on the album.
 The B-side is commonly referred to simply as "The Elevator," and a remix appears on 1999's Dreamscapes.

Chart performance

Weekly charts

Year-end charts

See also
List of number-one hits of 1984 (Italy)
List of number-one singles and albums in Sweden

References

1984 singles
1984 songs
Alphaville (band) songs
Number-one singles in Italy
Number-one singles in Sweden
Songs written by Bernhard Lloyd
Songs written by Frank Mertens
Songs written by Marian Gold
Warner Music Group singles